The Mac NC, sometimes referred to as the Macintosh NC, was a network thin client that was expected to be released by Apple by April 1998.  The device was widely promoted by then-Apple director Larry Ellison, apparently as part of his Oracle Network Computer initiative. The Mac NC was ultimately never released, although key components of its technology were inherited by the original iMac, which was released in August 1998.

History
On May 21, 1996, Oracle Corporation, along with 30 hardware and software vendors, announced an intent to build computers that are designed around the network computer platform. The idea was to design technology based on a profile that included diskless computers, commonly coded applications using languages such as Java, and interface with the internet using common software such as Netscape Navigator. 

In May 1996, Apple became a partner in the network computing effort, and used the Apple Pippin platform as its implementation. 

On July 9, 1997, Gil Amelio was ousted as CEO of Apple by the board of directors. Steve Jobs stepped in as the interim CEO, to begin a critical restructuring of the company's product line. He would eventually become CEO and served in that position until August 2011, shortly before his death.

Oracle Corporation CEO and Apple board member Larry Ellison announced in December 1997, while talking to the Harvard Computer Society, that Apple would release a product called the Macintosh NC in April 1998. He suggested the network computer would have a "near-300 MHz" processor and a 17-inch screen, and would sell for less than US$1,000 (with a hard disk drive available as an extra costing an additional $100).  

Steve Jobs did not agree, stating, "Unfortunately, [Ellison] is pretty far off base" in an e-mail. "Maybe he is trying to deflect interest from what we are really doing." While at Oracle, Ellison had overseen the development of a business alliance that produced a number of Network Computer-branded devices from companies such as Sun and IBM. Apple never manufactured any devices under the Oracle alliance, but did endorse the Network Computer Reference Profile. 

Steve Jobs had already stopped all Macintosh clone efforts, which would shut down the Apple Pippin concept and any prospects of the Mac NC.

Ultimately the technology shipped as NetBoot with the release of Mac OS X Server 1.0 in January 1999.

References

External links
Birth of the iMac article at The Mac Observer

Apple Inc. hardware
Macintosh platform
Network computer (brand)